Antosca is a surname. Notable people with the surname include:

Nick Antosca (born 1983), American writer, producer, and novelist
Stephanie Antosca, American television producer

See also

Antosia